Young and Dangerous 5 is a 1998 Hong Kong triad film. It is the fourth sequel in the Young and Dangerous film series.

Plot

Szeto Ho Nam from the Tung Sing Society attempts to take control of Causeway Bay by causing trouble at Chan Ho Nam's bars in Causeway Bay. Meanwhile, Big Head, a friend of Chan Ho Nam has been released from jail and works on the street as a vendor, attempting to have a peaceful life after being released without getting involved in gangster affairs. The Tung Sing members kept ruining Big Head's peaceful life by forcing him to give them money for protection racket.

Chian Tin Yeung, Sister 13, Chan Ho Nam, and many other branch leaders are invited to Malaysia by Chinese-Malaysian governor Chan Ka Nam. Chan Ka Nam fakes a business alliance with Chan Ho Nam, secretly helping Szeto Ho Nam to eliminate Chan Ho Nam. In Malaysia, Chan Ho Nam gets into a romantic relationship with Meiling, who's been forced to work for Chan Ka Nam. After she knows that she's been tricked, she decides to assist Chan Ho Nam in his plans to expose Chan Ka Nam.

After a confrontation with Tung Sing members, Banana Peel gets arrested and taken to the police station. There, he gets shot to death by a Tung Sing member whose brother was killed by Banana Peel during the confrontation.

Big Head decides to help Chan Ho Nam to fight a boxing match with the Tung Sing Society, whoever loses will need to disappear out of Causeway Bay. Big Head wins the match.

Meanwhile, Chan Ho Nam decides to challenge Szeto Ho Nam privately and Chan Ho Nam wins the fight as well.

At the end of the film, Chan Ka Nam gets beaten up by Pou Pan before getting arrested by the police, he was exposed with the help of Meiling and Tai Fei, who now runs a publishing office. Meiling and Chan Ho Nam officially begin their dating.

Cast and roles
 Ekin Cheng - Chan Ho Nam
 Jason Chu - Banana Skin
 Jerry Lamb - Pou-pan
 Chin Kar-lok - Big Head
 Shu Qi - Mei Ling
 Mark Cheng - Szeto Ho Nam
 Paul Chun - Datuk Chan Ka Nam
 Alex Man - Chiang Tin Yeung
 Sandra Ng - Sister 13
 Vincent Wan - Ben Hon
 Anthony Wong Chau-sang - Tai Fei
 Danny Lee - Inspector Lee
 Chan Chi Fai - Gambler on Ship
 Cheung Man		
 Billy Chow		
 Kwan Hoi-Shan - Datuk's Friend
 Law Lan - Granny Chan
 Lee Siu-Kei - Kei
 Simon Lui		
 Wang Tian-lin - Uncle Seventh
 Wong Chi Yeung	
 Wong Man-Wai - Datuk's Accuser

See also 
 Young and Dangerous (series)

External links 
 

1998 films
1990s Cantonese-language films
Triad films
Golden Harvest films
Films directed by Andrew Lau
Young and Dangerous
1990s Hong Kong films